The  is a railway line in Japan owned by Kintetsu Railway, connecting Osaka and Mie Prefecture via Nara Prefecture. The line is the longest double-tracked railway of non-JR operators. Together with the Nagoya Line, this line forms the route for Kintetsu limited express services connecting Osaka and Nagoya in competition with the Tokaido Shinkansen.

Rapid service
Along with charged Limited express, non-charged local and rapid services are operated on the line.
 (L)
Mostly using 6-car trains, operations are divided at Nabari. In the west trains normally run between Osaka Uehommachi and Takayasu or Kawachi-Kokubu. During the day, 6 trains operate per hour, 5 between Osaka Uehommachi and Takayasu, and one between Osaka Uehommachi and Kawachi-Kokubu. In the east, local trains run between Nabari or Aoyamacho and Ise-Nakagawa. Some trains continues as other train types west of Nabari.
 (SSE)
The service started on March 20, 2012. These operate using 6-car trains, between Osaka Uehommachi and Yamato-Asakura, Haibara, or Nabari, during off-peak hours.
 (SE)
Between Osaka Uehommachi and Takayasu, Haibara or Nabari, peak hours only, replacing suburban semi-express services, using 10-, 8-, or 6-car formations.
 (Ex)
Operated at all times except during rush hours in the peak direction, connecting Osaka Uehommachi and Aoyamachō or Isuzugawa on Toba Line, one and two services per hour respectively. These trains use short 6-car formations due to the lengths of platforms at Kawachi-Kokubu and Sambommatsu. Makes a connection to express train on Nagoya Line at Ise-Nakagawa.
 (RE)
Long distance rapid service replacing express trains at rush hours, between Osaka Uehommachi and Aoyamachō, or Matsusaka, Ujiyamada, Isuzugawa or Toba on Toba Line in Mie Prefecture. To the west of Nabari, they operate with up to 10 cars, to the west of Aoyamachō with up to 8 cars, and 4 or 6 cars in the eastern section.
Muroguchi-Ono and Akameguchi stations became stops of rapid express trains, but Iga-Kozu, Nishi-Aoyama, and Higashi-Aoyama stations are skipped.
After the schedule change on March 14, 2020, morning westbound trains are shortened between Aoyamacho and Osaka Uehommachi, and trains from the Yamada Line and the Toba Line are operated as express trains until Nabari.

Seat reservation required for an extra charge, between Osaka Uehommachi or Osaka Namba on the Kintetsu Namba Line in Osaka and Nagoya or the Ise - Shima region.

Stations
〇 : All trains stop.
▲ : Most trains stop
△ : Some trains stop

History

The Osaka Electric Railway opened the Osaka Uehommachi to Fuse section as  gauge dual track electrified at 600 V DC (as were all further sections unless otherwise noted) in 1914. The line was extended to Kintetsu Yao in 1924, and to Onji the following year. The Yamato-Takada to Yamato-Yagi section opened (with a single track) the same year, and was then linked to Onji and duplicated in 1927. The line was then extended to Sakurai in 1929 and the voltage on the Sakurai to Fuse section increased to 1,500 V DC to permit through-running with the Sangu Express Railway line (see below).

The Sangu Express Railway opened the Sakurai to Hase section in 1929, electrified at 1,500 V DC, and extended the line to Ise-Nakagawa the following year, single track beyond Nabari. The two companies became part of Kintetsu between 1941 and 1944.

The voltage on the Osaka Uehommachi to Fuse section was increased to 1,500 V DC in 1956, the Nabari to Iga-Kozu section was double-tracked between 1959 and 1961, and the rest of the line double-tracked between 1967 and 1975, when the 5,652 m Shin Aoyama tunnel was opened, at the time the longest tunnel built in Japan by a private railway.

Former connecting lines
 Sakurai Station: The Hase Railway opened a   gauge line to Hase in 1909. The company merged with the Osaka Electric Railway in 1928, the year before the Sangu Express Railway opened the Sakurai to Hase line in 1929, and the line closed in 1938. The Yamato Railway operated an  1,067 mm gauge line electrified at 600 V DC to Nishi-Tawaramoto on the Kashihara Line between 1923 and 1958.
 Iga-Kambe Station: The (first) Iga Railway opened a  1,067 mm gauge line between Iga-Ueno on the Kansai Main Line and Nishi-Nabari in 1922, including a connection at this station. The line was electrified at 1,500 V DC in 1926. The section to Nishi-Nabari closed in 1964, with the Iga Line operated by the (second) Iga Railway after Kintetsu transferred operation of the line in 2007.
 Ise-Ishibashi Station: The Dainippon Railway operated a   gauge line between Hisai on the Nagoya Line and Ise-Kawaguchi on the Meisho Line that connected here between 1925 and 1943.

References
This article incorporates material from the corresponding article in the Japanese Wikipedia.

Osaka Line
Rail transport in Osaka Prefecture
Rail transport in Nara Prefecture
Rail transport in Mie Prefecture
Standard gauge railways in Japan
Railway lines opened in 1914
1914 establishments in Japan